Square Dance Katy is a 1950 American musical film directed by Jean Yarbrough and written by Warren Wilson. The film stars Barbara Jo Allen, Jimmie Davis, Phil Brito, Virginia Welles, Warren Douglas and Sheila Ryan. The film was released on March 25, 1950 by Monogram Pictures.

Plot

Cast          
Barbara Jo Allen as Gypsy Jones 
Jimmie Davis as Jimmie Davis 
Phil Brito as Dodo Dixon
Virginia Welles as Katy O'Connor
Warren Douglas as Bob Carson
Sheila Ryan as Vicky Doran
Dorothy Vaughan as Ma O'Connor
Harry Cheshire as Kimbrough
Fenton Jones as Square-Dance Caller
Russell Hicks as Commissioner
Ray Walker as Businessman
William Forrest as Businessman
Tris Coffin as Franklin
Jon Riffel as Taxicab Driver
Warren Jackson as Fat Man
Donald Kerr as Waiter
Paul Bryar as Taxi Driver
Earle Hodgins as Slick
Frank Sully as Workman
Stanley Blystone as Policeman
Lee Phelps as Court Clerk
Edward Gargan as Police Officer Casey
Joseph Crehan as Judge

References

External links
 

1950 films
American musical films
1950 musical films
Monogram Pictures films
Films directed by Jean Yarbrough
American black-and-white films
1950s English-language films
1950s American films